Bert Teunissen (born 1959 Ruurlo, Gelderland) is a Dutch photographer who, since 1996, has documented European homes built before World War II and their inhabitants in his book Domestic Landscapes: A Portrait of Europeans at Home.  Teunissen has photographed houses built before electricity was common in order to preserve a quickly disappearing part of Western European life and culture. He later added images from Japan to his project.

Solo exhibitions
Museet for Fotokunst, Odense, DK 1999
Gentofte Hovedbibliotet, Copenhagen DK 2000
Gallery 24, New York, USA 2000
Møstings Hus, Copenhagen, DK 2000
Stedelijk Museum, Zutphen NL 2001
Konstmuseet, Ystad, S 2001
AA Kerk, Groningen, NL 2002
Artspace Witzenhausen NL 2003
Prague House of Photography Cz. 2004
Museu da Imagem, Braga Portugal 2004
Kienhuis Hoving, Enschede NL 2005
Biblioteca Central da UTAD, Vila Real, Portugal 2005
Océ 's Hertogenbosch NL 2005 - 2010
Art Amsterdam NL 2006
Huis Marseille, Amsterdam NL 2006
The Photographers' Gallery, London UK 2006
Aperture Gallery, New York USA 2007
Museum Haus Esters, Krefeld, Germany 2007

Books
Luister met je ogen-Het Josti Band Orkest 2001
Paleizen van het Geheugen-7 Leidse jongenskamers, Leiden, Antiquariaat van Paddenburgh 2003
Domestic Landscapes-Japan, Amsterdam, Artspace Witzenhausen 2003
Domestic Landscapes-Portugal, Braga, Museo da Imagem 2004
Domestic Landscapes-An Introduction Manual, Huizen, Bert Teunissen 2006
Domestic Landscapes-A Portrait of Europeans at Home, Aperture 2007
Domestic Landscapes-Ein Porträt von Europäern Daheim, Kerber 2007
On The Road-A Domestic Landscapes Travelog, Bert Teunissen 2008

External links
 Bert Teunissen's web site

1959 births
Living people
People from Berkelland
Dutch photojournalists